Wendell Bryant (born September 12, 1980) is a former American football defensive tackle. He was drafted by the Arizona Cardinals 12th overall in the 2002 NFL Draft. He played college football at Wisconsin.

College career
After graduating from Ritenour High School in St. Louis, Missouri, Bryant played college football at the University of Wisconsin–Madison. He played in back to back Rose Bowls his freshman & sophomore years of college. He had a key sack to help secure the 1999 Rose Bowl victory. He won the Big Ten defensive lineman of the Year Award in his junior and senior years.

Professional career

Arizona Cardinals
He was drafted by the Arizona Cardinals 12th overall, and played with the team during the 2002, 2003, and 2004 seasons. He was suspended for the 2005 season after committing a third strike in the NFL's substance abuse policy and never returned to the league.

Las Vegas Locomotives
Bryant was drafted by the Las Vegas Locomotives of the United Football League and signed on August 5, 2009. He was placed on injured reserve on November 19, 2009.

NFL statistics

References

External links
Just Sports Stats

1980 births
Living people
Players of American football from Minneapolis
American football defensive tackles
Wisconsin Badgers football players
Arizona Cardinals players
Las Vegas Locomotives players
Omaha Nighthawks players